"Hoover" is a song by Swedish rapper Yung Lean, released in 2016. A music video was originally released for the song in November 2015, and the song was released online digitally on January 20, 2016 in promotion for the upcoming Yung Lean album, Warlord.

Background
In a 2020 interview with Kerwin Frost, Yung Lean said that the song came from him and Gud wanting to make a song that had a "Korn, Slipknot vibe" and that he wanted to sound "evil".

Track listing

Personnel
Yung Lean – Vocals
Thaiboy Digital – Vocals on "How U Like Me Now?

Production

Yung Gud – Producer

References

2016 singles
2016 songs
Yung Lean songs